"Anyone" is a song by Canadian singer Justin Bieber. It was released through Def Jam Recordings on January 1, 2021, as the third single from his sixth studio album, Justice. Jon Bellion wrote the song with Bieber and producers Andrew Watt, the Monsters & Strangerz production trio (Alexander Izquierdo, Jordan K. Johnson, and Stefan Johnson), alongside Michael Pollack and Raul Cubina. At the 64th Annual Grammy Awards, "Anyone" received a nomination for Best Pop Solo Performance.

Background
Bieber revealed on April 10, 2020, during an Instagram Live that he had recorded a song called "Anyone". On December 30, 2020, Bieber announced on Twitter that the song would be released on January 1, 2021. He revealed the cover art and a 15-second trailer of the song's accompanying music video the following day. On December 31, 2020, Bieber performed his first full concert since 2017, which included the debut performance of "Anyone". Speaking of the song, Bieber said: "'Anyone' is such a special, hopeful, anthemic song. It sets the tone for a brighter new year full of hope and possibility".

Composition and lyrics
"Anyone" is a 1980s and 1990s-inspired synth-pop power ballad with a rhythmic pulse and blue-eyed soul influences. The song is three minutes and 10 seconds in length.

Chart performance 
"Anyone" debuted at its peak of number two on the Canadian Hot 100 issued for January 16, 2021. Music Canada certified the song Double Platinum. On the US Billboard Hot 100, it debuted and peaked at number six; it earned a Double Platinum certification from the Recording Industry Association of America (RIAA), which denotes 2,000,000 units based on sales and track-equivalent on-demand streams. "Anyone" entered at number four on the UK Singles Chart, and the British Phonographic Industry (BPI) certified it Gold. In Australia, the song debuted at number five and went Platinum. It peaked at number nine in New Zealand and received a Gold certification. "Anyone" charted within the top 10 of national record charts, at number two in Norway, number three in Denmark, number four in Hungary, Singapore, number five in Ireland, number six in Sweden, number seven in the Netherlands, number eight in Malaysia, and number nine in Finland. It received a Platinum certification in Denmark.

Music video 
The music video premiered on YouTube on January 1, 2021 at 05:00 UTC (midnight Eastern Standard Time). It was directed by American music video director and film maker Colin Tilley and stars American actress Zoey Deutch who plays Bieber's love interest in the video. Bieber portrays a 1940s boxer whose powerful love for his other half inspires him to train, fight, and eventually overcome a potential K.O. on his journey to becoming a champion. For the music video, Bieber covered up all of his tattoos.

Credits and personnel
Credits adapted from YouTube.
 Colin Tilley – direction
 James Ranta – production
 Whitney Jackson – production
 Elias Talbot – photography direction
 Vinnie Hobbs – editing
 SB Projects – management

Live performances 
Bieber performed the song for the first time during his New Year's Eve concert on December 31, 2020. He later performed the song on March 13, 2021, during the 2021 Kids' Choice Awards. In May 2, he performed the song on Big Brother Brasil 21.

Plagiarism allegation

In February 2021, American music professional Rick Beato compared "Anyone" to "Goin' Home" (1998), a song by American rock band Toto. He expressed his opinion that the choruses of the songs are written in the same key, and the melody and tempo are almost the same. Canadian radio station CKDR-FM expressed a similar opinion. American guitarist and Toto's founding member Steve Lukather accused Bieber of stealing "Goin' Home" in a May 2021 interview.

Credits and personnel
Credits adapted from Tidal.
 Justin Bieber – lead vocals, songwriting, background vocals
 Andrew Watt – production, songwriting, background vocals, drums, guitar, keyboards
 Jon Bellion – production, songwriting, background vocals, bass, drums, programming
 The Monsters & Strangerz – production, keyboards, programming
 Alexander Izquierdo – songwriting, background vocals
 Jordan K. Johnson – songwriting, background vocals
 Stefan Johnson – songwriting, background vocals
 Michael Pollack – songwriting, background vocals, keyboards
 Raul Cubina – songwriting, background vocals, percussion
 Heidi Wang – mixing assistance
 Colin Leonard – mastering
 Josh Gudwin – mixing
 Charlie Puth – piano
 Devin Nakao – record engineering
 Paul LaMalfa – record engineering

Charts

Weekly charts

Year-end charts

Certifications

Release history

References

External links
 
 

2020s ballads
2021 songs
2021 singles
Def Jam Recordings singles
Justin Bieber songs
Songs written by Jon Bellion
Songs written by Justin Bieber
Songs written by Andrew Watt (record producer)
Music videos directed by Colin Tilley
Songs written by Stefan Johnson
Songs written by Jordan Johnson (songwriter)
Songs written by Michael Pollack (musician)
Synth-pop ballads
Song recordings produced by Jon Bellion